In mathematics, Schur's lemma is an elementary but extremely useful statement in representation theory of groups and algebras. In the group case it says that if M and N are two finite-dimensional irreducible representations  
of a group G and φ is a linear map from M to N that commutes with the action of the group, then either φ is invertible, or φ = 0. An important special case occurs when M = N, i.e. φ is a self-map; in particular, any element of the center of a group must act as a scalar operator (a scalar multiple of the identity) on M. The lemma is named after Issai Schur who used it to prove the Schur orthogonality relations and develop the basics of the representation theory of finite groups. Schur's lemma admits generalisations to Lie groups and Lie algebras, the most common of which are due to Jacques Dixmier and Daniel Quillen.

Representation theory of groups
Such a homomorphism is called a representation of G on V. A representation on V is a special case of a group action on V, but rather than permit any arbitrary bijections (permutations) of the underlying set of V, we restrict ourselves to invertible linear transformations.

Let ρ be a representation of G on V. It may be the case that V has a subspace, W, such that for every element g of G,  the invertible linear map ρ(g) preserves or fixes W, so that (ρ(g))(w) is in W for every w in W, and (ρ(g))(v) is not in W for any v not in W. In other words, every linear map ρ(g): V→V is also an automorphism of W, ρ(g): W→W, when its domain is restricted to W. We say W is stable under G, or stable under the action of G. It is clear that if we consider W on its own as a vector space, then there is an obvious representation of G on W—the representation we get by restricting each map ρ(g) to W. When W has this property, we call W with the given representation a subrepresentation of V. Every representation of G has itself and the zero vector space as trivial subrepresentations. A representation of G with no non-trivial subrepresentations is called an irreducible representation. Irreducible representations – like the prime numbers, or like the simple groups in group theory – are the building blocks of representation theory. Many of the initial questions and theorems of representation theory deal with the properties of irreducible representations.

As we are interested in homomorphisms between groups, or continuous maps between topological spaces, we are interested in certain functions between representations of G. Let V and W be vector spaces, and let  and  be representations of G on V and W respectively. Then we define a  map f from V to W to be a linear map from V to W that is equivariant under the action of G; that is, for every g in G, . In other words, we require that f commutes with the action of G.  maps are the morphisms in the category of representations of G.

Schur's Lemma is a theorem that describes what  maps can exist between two irreducible representations of G.

Statement and Proof of the Lemma
Theorem (Schur's Lemma): Let V and W be vector spaces; and let  and  be irreducible representations of G on V and W respectively.
 If  finite-dimensional over an algebraically closed field (e.g. ); and if , then the only nontrivial  maps are the identity, and scalar multiples of the identity. (A scalar multiple of the identity is sometimes called a homothety.)

(It is easy to check that this is a subspace.) So  is stable under the action of G; it is a subrepresentation. Since by assumption  is irreducible,  must be zero; so  is injective.

By assumption it is not zero, so it is surjective, in which case it is an isomorphism.

(An eigenvalue exists for every linear transformation on a finite-dimensional vector space over an algebraically closed field.) Let . It is clear that  is a  map, because the sum or difference of  maps is also .

Corollary of Schur's Lemma

An important corollary of Schur's lemma follows from the observation that we can often build explicitly -linear maps between representations by "averaging" over the action of individual group elements on some fixed linear operator. In particular, given any irreducible representation, such objects will satisfy the assumptions of Schur's lemma, hence be scalar multiples of the identity. More precisely:

Corollary: Using the same notation from the previous theorem, let  be a linear mapping of V into W, and setThen,

 If  is finite-dimensional over an algebraically closed field (e.g. ); and if , then , where n is the dimension of V. That is,  is a homothety of ratio .

Proof:
Let us first show that  is a G-linear map, i.e.,  for all . Indeed, consider that

Now applying the previous theorem, for case 1, it follows that , and for case 2, it follows that  is a scalar multiple of the identity matrix (i.e.). To determine the scalar multiple , consider that

It then follows that .

This result has numerous applications. For example, in the context of quantum information science, it is used to derive results about complex projective t-designs.

Formulation in the language of modules 

If M and N are two simple modules over a ring R, then any homomorphism f: M → N of R-modules is either invertible or zero.  In particular, the endomorphism ring of a simple module is a division ring.  

The condition that f is a module homomorphism means that

 

The group version is a special case of the module version, since any representation of a group G can equivalently be viewed as a module over the group ring of G.

Schur's lemma is frequently applied in the following particular case. Suppose that R is an algebra over a field k and the vector space M = N is a  simple module of R. Then Schur's lemma says that the endomorphism ring of the module M is a division algebra over k.  If M is finite-dimensional, this division algebra is finite-dimensional.  If k is the field of complex numbers, the only option is that this division algebra is the complex numbers.  Thus the endomorphism ring of the module M is "as small as possible".  In other words, the only linear transformations of M that commute with all transformations coming from R are scalar multiples of the identity.

When the field is not algebraically closed, the case where the endomorphism ring is as small as possible is still of particular interest.

Representations of Lie groups and Lie algebras
We now describe Schur's lemma as it is usually stated in the context of representations of Lie groups and Lie algebras. There are three parts to the result.

Then  is either zero or an isomorphism.

Then  for some scalar .

A simple corollary of the second statement is that every complex irreducible representation of an abelian group is one-dimensional.

Application to the Casimir element
The universal property of the universal enveloping algebra ensures that  extends to a representation of  acting on the same vector space. The action of the Casimir element plays an important role in the proof of complete reducibility for finite-dimensional representations of semisimple Lie algebras.

See also Schur complement.

Generalization to non-simple modules 

The one module version of Schur's lemma admits generalizations involving modules M that are not necessarily simple. They express relations between the module-theoretic properties of M and the properties of the endomorphism ring of M.

A module is said to be strongly indecomposable if its endomorphism ring is a local ring.  For the important class of modules of finite length, the following properties are equivalent : 
 A module M is indecomposable;
 M is strongly indecomposable; 
 Every endomorphism of M is either nilpotent or invertible.

In general, Schur's lemma cannot be reversed: there exist modules that are not simple, yet their endomorphism algebra is a division ring. Such modules are necessarily indecomposable, and so cannot exist over semi-simple rings such as the complex group ring of a finite group.  However, even over the ring of integers, the module of rational numbers has an endomorphism ring that is a division ring, specifically the field of rational numbers.  Even for group rings, there are examples when the characteristic of the field divides the order of the group: the Jacobson radical of the projective cover of the one-dimensional representation of the alternating group A5 over the finite field with three elements F3 has F3 as its endomorphism ring.

See also 
Quillen's lemma

Notes

References
 
 
 
 
 

Representation theory
Lemmas
Theorems in representation theory